QEBH is a senior honor society at the University of Missouri. Founded in 1898, it is the oldest of six recognized secret honor societies that participate in the annual tradition of Tap Day on campus.

History
The society was founded in November 1898 by eight men.  They were Royall Hill Switzler, Thomas Benton Marbut, Gurry Ellsworth Huggins, William Frank Wilson, Clarence Martin Jackson, Horace Beckley Williams, Antoine Edward Russell, and Galius Lawton Zwick.  Royall Hill Switzler organized the first class of the society, and he is therefore credited as being the founder of QEBH.

QEBH's workings, purposes, and affairs are known only to its members.

Throughout its history, QEBH has maintained a rivalry with MU's Mystical Seven society. This rivalry has often involved the two societies playing pranks on each other.  In one instance in 1985, members of QEBH disguised themselves as members of Mystical Seven and surprised Mystical Seven's yet-to-be-initiated candidates at 4:30am one morning. The new candidates were convinced the activity was part of their initiation process, and they were taken to Jefferson City, Missouri where they were dropped off and abandoned by the disguised QEBH members.

Symbolism
The primary symbol of QEBH is the winged sphere.  The symbol's origin is that of the winged sphere that was once the distinctive mark of Jesse Hall.  The wings broke from the top of the dome when a patriotic student scaled the dome one night around the time of World War I and fastened the staff of a large American flag to the structure.  The flag caught enough wind to tear the wings from the dome, leaving only the golden sphere, which is still in place. The destruction of the wings from the dome was foreshadowed in the 1901 Savitar where mention is made of QEBH's secret meetings at the top of the dome, but it was later stated that "QEBH didn't take the wings off the dome."

Victory Bell
The tradition of the Victory Bell originated in 1927.  The bell was originally stolen from a church in Seward, Nebraska by Phi Delta Theta and Delta Tau Delta in 1892.  The two fraternities shared housing at the time, but when the groups later acquired their own individual houses they began an annual tradition of awarding the bell as a trophy to the winner of a specified athletic or academic contest.  When then Missouri athletic director Chester Brewer suggested a trophy be established for the winner of the annual Missouri–Nebraska Rivalry football game, the bell was chosen to fill the role.  An "M" was then engraved on one side of the bell and an "N" was engraved on the opposite side.  QEBH is the caretaker of the bell at Missouri, and the Innocents Society is the caretaker of the bell at Nebraska. Due to conference realignment, there has been a hiatus of the Missouri-Nebraska rivalry since 2010.

Early chapters

Chapter of 1898
Royall Hill Switzler (ΦΔΘ, ΦΒΚ) 
Thomas Benton Marbut
Antoine Edward Russell (ΒΘΠ, ΦΔΦ)
William Frank Wilson (KA, ΘΝΕ, ΦΔΦ)
Clarence Martin Jackson (ΦΒΚ, ΣΞ)
Gurry Ellsworth Huggins
Horace Beckley Williams (ΦΔΘ, MU Football)
Galius Lawton Zwick (ΣΑΕ, ΘΝΕ, ΦΔΦ, MU Baseball)

Chapter of 1899
George Harrison English (ΦΔΘ, ΘΝΕ, ΦΔΦ)
Raymond Saufley Edmonds (ΦΔΘ, ΘΝΕ, ΦΔΦ)
George Gordon Robertson (MU Tennis)
Irvin Victor Barth (ΘΝΕ, ΦΒΚ, ΦΔΦ)
Don Carlos Guffey (ΚΣ)
Libsom Elwood Durham
Joe Shelby McIntyre (ΘΝΕ, ΦΔΦ)
Frank Young Gladney
Richmond Laurin Hawkins (MU Baseball)
Merritt Kimbrough Salmon (ΣΑΕ)

Chapter of 1900
John Louis Deister (ΦΒΚ)
Elmer C. Peper (ΦΔΘ, ΘΝΕ)
Charles Shumway Ruffner (ΦΔΘ, ΘΝΕ, ΤΒΠ)
Forest Shepard Lyman (ΚΣ, ΤΒΠ)
Arthur Graham Ficklin
Lee Utley (KA, ΘΝΕ)
William F. Switzler (ΦΔΘ)
William Cardwell Lucas (ΣΑΕ, ΘΝΕ, ΦΔΦ)
Gilbert Barlow (ΒΘΠ)
Francis Marvin Motter

Notable student members

Ben Askren (Chapter of 2006), 2006 NCAA individual national wrestling champion and Sports Illustrated Collegiate Wrestler of the Year
Forrest C. Donnell (Chapter of 1904), former Governor of Missouri
Harvey P. Eisen (Chapter of 1964), Chairman of Bedford Oak Advisors
Martin Frost (Chapter of 1964), Democratic representative to the U.S. House of Representatives for Texas's 24th congressional district from 1979 to 2005
John R. Gibson (Chapter of 1950), Senior Federal Judge, U.S. Court of Appeals for the Eighth Circuit
Kenny Hulshof (Chapter of 1999), U.S. Congressman
Richard D. Kinder (Chapter of 1966), CEO of Kinder Morgan
Derrick Peterson (Chapter of 1999), US Olympic Track and Field Athlete in 2004
Ike Skelton (Chapter of 1957), U.S. Congressman
Sam M. Walton (Chapter of 1940), founder of Walmart
Kellen Winslow (Chapter of 1987), NFL Hall of Fame Tight End
Hardin Cox (Chapter of 1952), Missouri House of Representative (1964-1974), Missouri State Senator (1974 1982), Member of 1945 Missouri Tiger's Football Team and Big Six Champions
Tim Kaine (Chapter of 1979), Senator (VA), former Governor of Virginia and U.S. Vice Presidential Candidate
Steve Stipanovich (Chapter of 1983), Retired NBA basketball player
Jon Sundvold (Chapter of 1981), Retired NBA basketball player

Notable honor taps

Christopher S. "Kit" Bond, U.S. Senator
Claire McCaskill (Chapter of 2003), U.S. Senator
August Busch, Jr. (Chapter of 1969), American brewing magnate and former owner of the St. Louis Cardinals
Thomas F. Eagleton (Chapter of 1964), former U.S. Senator
Chuck Graham (Chapter of 2006), Missouri State Senator
Warren E. Hearnes (Chapter of 1966), former Governor of Missouri 
Pinkney Walker (Chapter of 1962), former MU Economics professor who was appointed to the Federal Power Commission by President Nixon.
Don Walsworth (Chapter of 2007), Founder of Walsworth Publishing Company
Clyde Lear (Chapter of 2007), Chairman of Learfield Communications, Inc.
Darwin Hindman (Chapter of 2004), former Mayor of City of Columbia (MO)
Brady Deaton (Chapter of 1999), former University of Missouri Chancellor
Richard Wallace (Chapter of 1998), former University of Missouri Chancellor
R. Bowen Loftin (Chapter of 2015), former University of Missouri Chancellor
James Spain (Chapter of 2003), Vice Provost for Undergraduate Studies at the University of Missouri
Michael Alden (Chapter of 2001), former Director of Athletics at University of Missouri
Arvarh Strickland (Chapter of 1996), former MU History professor, first African American professor at the University of Missouri
H. Clyde Wilson Jr. (Chapter of 1972), former MU Anthropology professor, former Mayor of City of Columbia (MO)
Gary Pinkel (Chapter of 2016), Mizzou Football head coach from 2001-2015. Winningest football coach at both University of Toledo and University of Missouri.
Robert G. Bailey (Chapter of 1984), Assistant Dean Emeritas University of Missouri School of Law
Dr. Melvin George (Chapter of 2013), Beloved Professor, Founder of MU's Core Values, and two-time Interim President of the University of Missouri System
José Gutiérrez (Chapter of 2016), Executive Vice President at AT&T, Vice Chairman of the Thompson Foundation for Autism and Neurodevelopmental Disorders, and Member of the World Affairs Council

See also
 Honor society
 LSV Society
 Mystical Seven (Missouri)

References

Collegiate secret societies
Honor societies
Student societies in the United States
University of Missouri
Student organizations established in 1898
1898 establishments in Missouri